Livia is a genus of psylloids. Nymphs form galls in the developing shoots of rushes and sedges.

Taxonomy
Livia contains the following species:
 Livia vernaliforma
 Livia opaqua
 Livia caricis
 Livia vernalis
 Livia lobata
 Livia crawfordi
 Livia manitobensis
 Livia saltatrix
 Livia crefeldensis
 Livia limbata
 Livia maculipennis
 Livia jesoensis
 Livia junci
 Livia bifasciata

References

Liviidae
Insects described in 1802